Arthonia elegans is a species of lichen in the family Arthoniaceae.

References

Arthoniomycetes
Lichens described in 1810
Lichen species
Taxa named by Erik Acharius